The Kometopuli dynasty (Bulgarian: , 
Bulgarian; ; Byzantine Greek:) was the last royal dynasty in the First Bulgarian Empire, ruling from ca. 976 until the fall of Bulgaria under Byzantine rule in 1018. The most notable member of the dynasty, Tsar Samuel, is famous for successfully resisting Byzantine conquest for more than 40 years. Sometimes the realm of the Cometopuli is called Western Bulgarian Kingdom or Western Bulgarian Empire.

Origin and members

The actual name of the dynasty is not known. According to the 11th century Armenian historian, Stepanos Asoghik, the dynasty was of Armenian origin. In 969 AD and following the Russo-Byzantine conquest of Eastern Bulgaria, count Nikola assumed control of the Bulgarian lands west of the rivers Iskar and Struma. By the time of the Byzantine conquest of Preslav and the dethronement of Tsar Boris II in 972, Nikola had been killed and the rule assumed by his four sons, David, Aaron, Moses, and Samuil. David led the defence of southwestern Bulgaria and resided in Prespa, Moses of southeastern Bulgaria residing in Strumica, Aaron ruled over the region of Sredetz, whereas Samuel was in charge of northern Bulgaria with the town of Bdin (Vidin).

Both David and Moses lost their lives early – David was murdered by wandering Vlachs, whereas Moses died during the siege of Serres. A conflict broke out between Samuil and Aaron as the latter grew more and more pro-Byzantine and on 14 June 976 Aaron was executed near Dupnitza. Later the same year, the dethroned Boris II and his brother, Roman, managed to escape from captivity in Constantinople and reached the borders of Bulgaria. Boris II was, however, killed by mistake by the border guards. As a result, it was Roman who was crowned as Bulgarian Tsar although real power and the control of the army lay in the hands of Samuel.

Samuel proved to be a successful leader inflicting a major defeat on the Byzantine army commanded by Basil II at the Gates of Trajan and retaking north-eastern Bulgaria. His successful campaigns expanded the Bulgarian borders into Thessaly and Epirus and in 998 he conquered the principality of Duklja. In 997 Samuel was proclaimed Emperor of Bulgaria after the death of the legitimate ruler, Roman.

After the death of Samuel in 1014, the crown passed on to his son, Gavril Radomir (1014 – 1015). In 1015, he was murdered by his first cousin and son of Aaron, Ivan Vladislav. With his own death in 1018 the First Bulgarian Empire came to an end. Ivan Vladislav's sons Presian, Alusian and Aaron surrendered shortly after and were integrated into the court nobility in Constantinople. An attempt at restoration of Bulgarian independence was made some 20 years later by Peter (II) Delyan (1040-1041), son of Gavril Radomir. He, aided by his cousin Alusian organised an uprising and managed to push away the Byzantines from Ohrid for a short period, but was eventually betrayed by Alusian. Alusian's heirs were given noble titles and land in the Byzantine Empire.

Family tree

After the Byzantine conquest of Bulgaria, the Cometopuli assumed important positions in the Byzantine court after they were resettled and given lands in Asia Minor and Armenia. Catherine, daughter of Bulgarian Emperor Ivan Vladislav, became empress of Byzantium. Peter II Delyan, son of Bulgarian Emperor Gavril Radomir and grandson of Emperor Samuel, led an attempt to restore the Bulgarian Empire after a major uprising in 10401041. Two other women of the dynasty became Byzantine empresses, while many nobles served in the army as strategos or became governors of various provinces. Through his maternal grandmother Maria of Bulgaria, the Byzantine emperor John II Komnenos was a descendant of Emperor Ivan Vladislav.

Nomenclature

There has been a debate among historians, in which some view the Kingdom of the Cometopuli, as a separate entity from the First Bulgarian Empire. The Cometopuli kept the title "Emperor of Bulgarians", but some aspects that appeared during their reign, made their state differ from the Bulgarian empire. Its centres (Skopje, Ohrid, Prespa and Bitola) were located in what today is referred to as the geographical region of Macedonia, but at that period, they were in a province of the First Bulgarian Empire, called Kutmichevitsa. The  Byzantinologist George Ostrogorsky discusses the issue and concludes that to its creators and to the Byzantines it was simply Bulgarian kingdom, but for various geographical, political and religious factors he labels their state Macedonian Empire. Dimitri Obolensky, another Byzantinologist, refers to Samuil's state as an "independent empire of Western Bulgaria" that originated in Macedonia. Some other authors also distinguish it as a Western Bulgarian Empire, but most of the scholars see the dynasty as a direct continuation of the First Bulgarian Empire. However, in North Macedonia the official historiography refers to it as "Slavic Macedonian" Empire, but this view is an instance for backdated modern nationalism.

Notes

References

Literature
 
 Lang, David M. The Bulgarians, London, 1976.
 Lang, David M. The Armenians. A People in Exile. London, 1981.
 Ostrogorsky, George, History of the Byzantine State. tr. (from the German) by Joan Hussey, rev. ed., Rutgers Univ. Press, 1969.
 Dimitry Obolensky, "The Bogomils: A study in Balkan Neo-Manicheism", Cambridge University Press 1948

See also
 Samuil of Bulgaria
 Bitola Inscription
 Samuil's Inscription
 History of Bulgaria
 Armenians in Bulgaria